This is an incomplete List of ghost towns in Montana.

A ghost town is a town or city which has lost all of its businesses and population. A town often becomes a ghost town because the economic activity that supported it has failed, or due to natural or human-caused disasters such as a flood, government action, uncontrolled lawlessness, or war.

The term is sometimes used in a deprecated sense on the internet to include cities, towns, and neighborhoods which, while still populated, are significantly less so than in years past.

Abandoned towns

Aldridge, Park County, Montana, el. ,
Bannack, Beaverhead County, Montana, el. 
Coloma, Missoula County, Montana , el. 
Diamond City, Broadwater County, Montana, el. , and satellite communities of El Dorado, Boulder, Jim Town, and Cement Gulch City, all in Confederate Gulch, Montana.  
Junction City, Yellowstone County, Montana, 
Rancher, Montana, Treasure County, Montana
Rocky Point, Fergus County, Montana, 
Thoeny, Montana, Valley County, Montana 
Wheat Basin, Stillwater County, Montana

Towns with residual population

Albion, Carter County, Montana , el. 
Aldridge, Park County, Montana
Alton built in 2009 glacier Montana 
Argo
Barker, Judith Basin County, Montana
Bean, Carbon County, Montana
Bear Creek, Carbon County, Montana
Bearmouth, Granite County, Montana
Bighorn, Treasure County, Montana
Beehive, Stillwater County, Montana
Bowler, Carbon County, Montana
Cable, Deer Lodge County, Montana
Capitol, Carter County, Montana
Carlyle, Wibaux County, Montana, el. 
Carter, Chouteau County, Montana
Castle Town, Meagher County, Montana, el. 
Chico, Park County, Montana
Coburg, Blaine County, Montana
Comanche, Yellowstone County, Montana
Comertown, Sheridan County, Montana, el. 
Comet, Jefferson County, Montana
Coolidge, Deer Lodge County, Montana
Copperopolis, Meagher County, Montana
Corwin
Coulson, Yellowstone County, Montana
Dean, Stillwater County, Montana
Dooley, Sheridan County, Montana
Electric, Park County, Montana
Elkhorn, Jefferson County, Montana
Ewing, Carbon County, Montana
Exeter, Phillips County, Montana
Finch, Rosebud County, Montana
Fox, Carbon County, Montana 
Garnet, Granite County, Montana
Giltedge, Fergus County, Montana
Glendale, Beaverhead County, Montana
Gold Creek, Powell County, Montana
Granite, Granite County, Montana
Hassel, Broadwater County, Montana
Hecla, Beaverhead County, Montana
Hesper, Yellowstone County, Montana
Hillsboro, Big Horn County, Montana
Hughesville, Judith Basin County, Montana
Independence, Park County, Montana
Ingomar, Rosebud County, Montana
Jardine, Park County, Montana
Kendall, Fergus County, Montana
Keystone, Mineral County, Montana
Kirkville, Granite County, Montana
Landusky, Phillips County, Montana
Laurin, Madison County, Montana
Lennep, Meagher County, Montana
Leroy, Blaine County, Montana
Limestone, Stillwater County, Montana
Lion City, Beaverhead County, Montana
Lonetree, Chouteau County, Montana
Maiden, Fergus County, Montana
Mammoth, Madison County, Montana
Marysville, Lewis and Clark County, Montana
Maudlow, Gallatin County, Montana
Melrose, Silver Bow County, Montana
Minden, Meagher County, Montana
Mondak, Montana, Roosevelt County, Montana
Nevada City, Madison County, Montana
Pardee, Mineral County, Montana
Perma, Sanders County, Montana
Pioneer, Beaverhead County, Montana
Pioneer, Powell County, Montana
Princeton, Granite County, Montana
Pony, Madison County, Montana
Quartz, Mineral County, Montana
Quietus, Big Horn County, Montana
Red Bluff, Madison County, Montana
Red Lion, Granite County, Montana
Rimini, Lewis and Clark County, Montana
Rimrock, Yellowstone County, Montana
Ringling, Meagher County, Montana
Rockvale, Carbon County, Montana
Ruby, Madison County, Montana
Ruby Gulch, Phillips County, Montana
Silesia, Carbon County, Montana
Silver Bow, Silver Bow County, Montana
Sixteen, Meagher County, Montana
Southern Cross, Deer Lodge County, Montana
Square Butte, Chouteau County, Montana
Stark, Missoula County, Montana
Storrs, Gallatin County, Montana
Sumatra, Rosebud County, Montana
Taft, Mineral County, Montana
Thoeny, Valley County, Montana
Tower
Trapper City, Beaverhead County, Montana
Trident, Gallatin County, Montana
Vananda, Rosebud County, Montana
Vandalia, Valley County, Montana
Virginia City, Madison County, Montana
Washoe, Carbon County, Montana
Wagner, Phillips County, Montana
Wheat Basin, Stillwater County, Montana
Wickes, Lewis and Clark County, Montana
Yellowstone City Park County, Montana
Zortman, Phillips County, Montana

See also

History of Montana
Timeline of Montana history
Timeline of pre-statehood Montana history
List of cities and towns in Montana
List of counties in Montana
List of places in Montana
Outline of Montana

Further reading

Notes

 
Montana
Ghost towns in Montana
Ghost towns